

September

Transactions, 1922-23
National Hockey League transactions